Gary Eddy (born 25 March 1945) is an Australian former sprinter who competed in the 1964 Summer Olympics.

Gary is 3rd in the all time Australian 100 yard time of 9.52, in the 1966 Commonwealth Games, only Rohan Browning and 
Jack Hale have gone faster.

External links 
 Gary Eddy at Australian Athletics Historical Results
 Gary Eddy at trackfield.brinkster.net
 

1945 births
Living people
Australian male sprinters
Olympic athletes of Australia
Athletes (track and field) at the 1964 Summer Olympics
Athletes (track and field) at the 1966 British Empire and Commonwealth Games
Athletes (track and field) at the 1970 British Commonwealth Games
Commonwealth Games bronze medallists for Australia
Commonwealth Games medallists in athletics
Medallists at the 1966 British Empire and Commonwealth Games